Alan Robertson may refer to:

Alan Robertson (footballer) (born 1952), Scottish footballer and coach
Alan Robertson (South African soccer player) (born 1994), South African soccer player
Alan Robertson (geneticist) (1920–1989), English population geneticist
Alan Robertson (swimmer), New Zealand swimmer
Alan Robertson (judge) (born 1950), former judge Federal Court of Australia (2011–2020)
Alan S. Robertson (born 1941), former member of the Wisconsin State Assembly
Alan W. Robertson (1906–1978), British philatelist

See also
Allan Robertson (1815–1859), Scottish golfer